The Minister for Sports is the sports minister of Sweden and responsible for issues regarding sports.

The position of Minister for Sports has usually been held by a minister as a part of a wider ministerial portfolio, and it has sorted under different ministries throughout the years.

The current Minister for Sports is Jakob Forssmed of the Christian Democrats. He concurrently serves as the Minister for Social Affairs.

Spokesperson for the Government's sports policy 
In the end of the 1970s, at the appointment of the Ullsten Cabinet. Prime Minister Ola Ullsten appointed Rune Ångström as spokesperson for the Government's sport policy. The position existed between 1978–1979.

List of Ministers for Sports

Ministry history 
The office of Minister for Sports has been under several different ministries since its founding in 1988.

References

Government ministers of Sweden